The 2011 Prairie View A&M Panthers football team represented Prairie View A&M University as a member of the West Division of the Southwestern Athletic Conference (SWAC) during the 2011 NCAA Division I FCS football season. The Panthers were led by first year head coach Heishma Northern and played their home games at Edward L. Blackshear Field. Prairie View A&M finished the season with an overall record of 5–6 and a conference mark of 5–4, tying for second place in the West Division.

Schedule

References

Prairie View AandM
Prairie View A&M Panthers football seasons
Prairie View AandM Panthers football